Robert G. "Bob" Knight (born July 31, 1941) was the Republican mayor of Wichita, Kansas for seven terms. He first ran for office, Wichita City Council, in 1979. He also served under Democratic Governor Joan Finney as Kansas Secretary of Commerce and Housing. He is generally known as "Bob Knight."

References 

Mayors of Wichita, Kansas
State cabinet secretaries of Kansas
Kansas Republicans
1941 births
Living people